The Pentagon rapid response operation was a public relations initiative by the United States Department of Defense to "quickly respond to news media stories critical of ... the Iraq War, as well as other stories the Defense Department leadership doesn't like."

History
An October 3, 2006 memo written by Dorrance Smith, the assistant secretary of defense for public affairs,  obtained later by the Associated Press, described the team's role. The memo envisioned that the team would "'develop messages' for the 24-hour news cycle and 'correct the record'" in a way similar to political campaign operations, such as Bill Clinton's successful 1992 presidential campaign. Smith also set forth four branches of the operation: "New Media" (for Web sites, podcasts, and YouTube); "Rapid Response" (for letters to the editor); "TV and Radio Booking" (for booking civilian and military guests on cable news and radio); and "Surrogates" (for "analysts who speak publicly, often on behalf of the Pentagon"). During the brief life of the "'rapid response cell," a "team of public affairs officers working behind closed doors ... churn[ed] out e-mail messages, press releases, opinion pieces and corrections to perceived inaccuracies or biased reporting worldwide." 

The Pentagon rapid-response unit was a priority of U.S. Secretary of Defense Donald Rumsfeld, and some congressional Democrats criticized the initiative as excessively focused on Rumsfeld's personal reputation, rather than the reputation of the U.S. armed forces. Soon after being sworn in as secretary of defense in 2007, Rumsfeld's successor Robert Gates disbanded the unit.

See also
Pentagon military analyst program
Propaganda in the United States
Information warfare
U.S. Military Television Network

References

External links
David Martin on the Pentagon's 'Quick-Reaction Squad' CBS News, November 10, 2006

United States Department of Defense
Presidency of George W. Bush
Iraq War and the media